is a waterfall in the Ani district of Kitaakika, Akita Prefecture, Japan, in on the Yoneshiro River. It is one of "Japan’s Top 100 Waterfalls", in a list published by the Japanese Ministry of the Environment in 1990.

The falls are in two levels, the main drop of 60 meters on the upper level and a smaller drop of 30 meters on the lower level. Between levels is the basin of the first waterfall which is a wide space than can be hiked to easily.

External links
  Ministry of Environment

Waterfalls of Japan
Landforms of Akita Prefecture
Tourist attractions in Akita Prefecture
Kitaakita